The Hong Kong Japanese School and Japanese International School (HKJS&JIS) is a Japanese international school in Hong Kong. It consists of a Japanese section and international section. The Hong Kong Japanese School Limited operates the school system.

The Japanese primary and secondary school sections are in a campus located along Blue Pool Road, in Happy Valley. The international school is in Tai Po. The Tai Po campus opened in 1997. The Japanese secondary school was previously located in Braemar Hill, North Point.

History
A school for Japanese children opened in 1946, with eight people employed to teach. South China Morning Post stated the initial enrollment was 70.

According to the HKJS website, it was established in May 1966 (Showa 41), and opened on 10 May of that year. According to Vivienne Poy, her father, Richard Charles Lee, helped facilitate the establishment of the school. It opened because the government of Japan dedicated a subsidiary budget for it.

The initial location was floors two and three of Tower Court (崇明大廈). Its official opening ceremony was on 15 October. At the time it covered only primary grades, and its enrollment was 84. Additional space in the Ling Ying Building (嶺英商場) was used, beginning in April 1971, for kindergarten and primary school classes. The current Japanese section elementary campus opened on 24 January 1976. On 23 October 1982 the Japanese section junior high campus opened.

Beginning circa 1994 the school engaged in exchange programmes with Hong Kong schools for children from Hong Kong and with other international schools in Hong Kong and Macau.

In 1996 protesters against Japanese claims on the Senkaku Islands/Diaoyu Islands did activities outside of the Happy Valley school, as part of the Senkaku Islands dispute. Principal Akihiro Kaku argued that the consulate general would have been a more appropriate protest area, not the school. The Hong Kong Post characterized the incident as an attack against the school.

In 1994 the school system asked the Hong Kong government for permission to build a new school for an international section. The international school in Tai Po opened in 1997. The funds used to build the campus came from a grant issued by the Hong Kong government.

In April 2018 the junior high school moved to the Happy Valley campus.

Divisions
The Japanese division uses the Japanese school calendar and curriculum while the English-medium international division uses Hong Kong's school calendar. The international division has students who will reside in Hong Kong and/or otherwise reside outside of Japan in the long run.

Maps

See also
 Japanese people in Hong Kong
 Hong Kong Post (香港ポスト)

References

Further reading
 
  - The Phoenix Publication #13 had the Japanese original. - Fujita was a principal of the school.

 Kojima, Masaru (小島 勝 Kojima Masaru). "The Hong Kong Japanese School and the Hong Kong Hongwan-ji Temple in the period before the World War II" (Archive, 香港日本人学校の動向と香港本願寺). Bulletin of Buddhist Cultural Institute (佛教文化研究所紀要), Ryukoku University. 43, A42-A61, 2004-11-30. See profile at CiNii.
 Osaki, Hirofumi (大崎 博史 Ōsaki Hirofumi; 国立特殊教育総合研究所教育相談部). "中国・広州日本人学校,香港・香港日本人学校小学部香港校,台湾・台北日本人学校における特別支援教育の実情と教育相談支援" (Archive). 世界の特殊教育 21, 57-63, 2007-03. National Institute of Special Needs Education (独立行政法人国立特別支援教育総合研究所). - See profile at CiNii.
 今田 好彦. "香港日本人学校" (subscription required). アジア經濟旬報 (963), 1-2, 1975-02-21. Institute of Chinese Affairs (一般社団法人中国研究所). See profile at CiNii.
 鈴木 哲明 ((現)福島県郡山市立桃見台小学校:香港日本人学校). "世界に羽ばたく国際人の育成 : 香港日本人学校での実践(第3回教育研究大会報告)" (Archive). 創大教育研究 14, 37-39, 2005-03. Soka University. See profile at CiNii.
 中野 佐江子 (香港日本人学校小学部香港校) and 小林 倫代 (国立特別支援教育総合研究所教育研修情報部). "香港日本人学校における特別支援教育の実際 : 児童一人ひとりに応じた支援・指導を目指して" (Archive). 国立特別支援教育総合研究所教育相談年報 31, 13-18, 2010-06. National Institute of Special Needs Education (独立行政法人国立特別支援教育総合研究所). - See profile at CiNii.
 高羅 富彦 (大阪府松原市立松原東小学校・香港日本人学校大埔校(前)). "香港日本人学校大埔校での教育実践(第4章国際理解教育・現地理解教育)." 在外教育施設における指導実践記録 28, 63-65, 2005. Tokyo Gakugei University. See profile at CiNii.
 丸山 実子 (日本人墓地通して歴史を学ぶ—清掃で奉仕精神育てる授業がスタート 香港日本人学校小学部・香港校). 内外教育 (5223), 6, 2001-08-03. 時事通信社. See profile at CiNii.
 椛沢 克彦 (欧米インター校と張り合う「一校両制」の香港日本人学校). 時事評論 31(3), 16, 1999-06. 外交知識普及会. See profile at CiNii.

External links

 Hong Kong Japanese School and Japanese International School - Japanese section site in Japanese, international section site in English

Hong Kong
Hong Kong
International schools in Hong Kong
Primary schools in Hong Kong
Secondary schools in Hong Kong
1966 establishments in Hong Kong
Educational institutions established in 1966